Mavelikara Maruthakshi Devi Temple is a Hindu temple in Kerala, India.

References

Hindu temples in Alappuzha district